Vuyo Mere (born 5 March 1984) is a South African soccer player who plays as a defender for Premier Soccer League club TS Galaxy.

External links
Titles: 2 Premier League Winner

1984 births
Living people
Sportspeople from Bloemfontein
Soccer players from the Free State (province)
South African soccer players
South Africa international soccer players
2006 Africa Cup of Nations players
Association football defenders
Hellenic F.C. players
Mamelodi Sundowns F.C. players
Moroka Swallows F.C. players
Platinum Stars F.C. players
Bidvest Wits F.C. players
TS Galaxy F.C. players
South Africa A' international soccer players
2014 African Nations Championship players